Baccharis monoica is a species or subspecies of flowering plants in the family Asteraceae.

It is the only non-dioecious species in the genus Baccharis, it is a monoecious species.

It can be found in Belize, El Salvador, Guatemala, Honduras, Mexico, and Nicaragua.

References

monoica